Sag Kash Durak (also Romanized as Sag Kash Dūraḵ) is a village in Darreh Kayad Rural District, Sardasht District, Dezful County, Khuzestan Province, Iran. At the 2006 census, its population was 56, in 12 families.

References 

Populated places in Dezful County